St. John is a town in Whitman County, Washington, United States. The population was 537 at the 2010 census. St. John is the birthplace of the twentieth governor of Washington, Mike Lowry.

History

St. John was founded and named in the late 1880s for settler E.T. St. John.  St. John was officially incorporated on March 10, 1904.

E.T. St. John was Edward Talbert St. John (1812-1894). Edward was the son of Pierce St. John and Mary Talbot/Talbert. Before making his way to Whitman County, Washington he abandoned his family in Indiana around 1845. He seems to have wandered around before settling in Whitman and founding the town of St. John.

Geography
St. John is located at  (47.090403, -117.582085).

Climate
St. John's climate is classified as warm-summer Mediterranean climate (Csb) according to the Köppen climate classification system, but nearly qualifies as a dry-summer humid continental climate due to its cold winter months.

Demographics

2010 census
As of the census of 2010, there were 537 people, 261 households, and 145 families residing in the town. The racial makeup of the town was 94.6% White, 0.2% African American, 0.4% Native American, 0.2% Asian, 0.4% Pacific Islander, 0.4% from other races, and 3.9% from two or more races. Hispanic or Latino of any race were 1.9% of the population.

There were 261 households, of which 22.2% had children under the age of 18 living with them, 47.1% were married couples living together, 6.9% had a female householder with no husband present, 1.5% had a male householder with no wife present, and 44.4% were non-families. 39.5% of all households were made up of individuals, and 22.6% had someone living alone who was 65 years of age or older. The average household size was 2.06 and the average family size was 2.78.

The median age in the town was 50.8 years. 22.3% of residents were under the age of 18; 3.8% were between the ages of 18 and 24; 15.3% were from 25 to 44; 28.8% were from 45 to 64; and 29.8% were 65 years of age or older. The gender makeup of the town was 45.8% male and 54.2% female.

2000 census
As of the census of 2000, there were 548 people, 258 households, and 163 families residing in the town. The population density was 1,056.2 people per square mile (406.9/km2). There were 279 housing units at an average density of 537.7 per square mile (207.2/km2). The racial makeup of the town was 97.81% White, 0.18% Native American, 0.55% Asian, and 1.46% from two or more races. Hispanic or Latino of any race were 1.64% of the population.

There were 258 households, out of which 22.1% had children under the age of 18 living with them, 54.7% were married couples living together, 5.8% had a female householder with no husband present, and 36.8% were non-families. 34.1% of all households were made up of individuals, and 20.2% had someone living alone who was 65 years of age or older. The average household size was 2.12 and the average family size was 2.72.

In the town, the age distribution of the population shows 20.8% under the age of 18, 3.3% from 18 to 24, 20.4% from 25 to 44, 25.2% from 45 to 64, and 30.3% who were 65 years of age or older. The median age was 49 years. For every 100 females, there were 93.6 males. For every 100 females age 18 and over, there were 86.3 males.

The median income for a household in the town was $33,393, and the median income for a family was $44,643. Males had a median income of $31,389 versus $18,750 for females. The per capita income for the town was $18,722. About 5.4% of families and 7.4% of the population were below the poverty line, including 13.2% of those under age 18 and 3.6% of those age 65 or over.

References

External links
St. John website

Towns in Whitman County, Washington
Towns in Washington (state)
1904 establishments in Washington (state)